"Lullaby of Broadway" is a popular song with music written by Harry Warren and lyrics by Al Dubin, published in  1935. The lyrics salute the nightlife of Broadway and its denizens, who "don't sleep tight until the dawn."

The song was introduced by Wini Shaw in the musical film Gold Diggers of 1935, and, in an unusual move, it was used as background music in a sequence in the Bette Davis film Special Agent that same year. Furthermore, again that year, it was sung by Jeane Cowan in a night club scene in the James Cagney film G Men. In three Warner Bros. films, it won the 1935 Academy Award for Best Original Song.

Lyrics
Unlike the song "Manhattan" and many others, "Lullaby of Broadway" does not name-check any Broadway locations. The line, "The daffydils who entertain / At Angelo's and Maxie's" references a fictitious place (or places), presumably within the context of the film. "Daffydils" — often sung as "daffodils" — was a slang term for chorus girls (or indeed boys, depending on the venue). Since the song was written, several real establishments have opened on or around Broadway, adopting the name from the song, rather than vice versa.

Popular recordings
Hit versions in 1935 were by:
The Dorsey Brothers Orchestra (vocal by Bob Crosby)
Little Jack Little
Reginald Foresythe
Hal Kemp (vocal: Bob Allen)
Chick Bullock

Other versions have been recorded by:
1944 The Andrews Sisters - recorded August 24, 1944 for Decca Records.
1951 Doris Day recorded the song twice in 1950. The first was with the Norman Luboff Choir and the Buddy Cole Quartet on December 8. This was included in the album Lullaby of Broadway. The second was on December 28, 1950 with Harry James and his orchestra. (Doris Day discography).
1956 Bing Crosby recorded the song  for use on his radio show and it was subsequently included in the box set The Bing Crosby CBS Radio Recordings (1954-56) issued by Mosaic Records (catalog MD7-245) in 2009. 
1957 Tony Bennett for his album The Beat of My Heart.
1959 Ella Fitzgerald recorded the song on her Verve release Ella Fitzgerald Sings Sweet Songs for Swingers, accompanied by the Frank DeVol Orchestra.
1962 The song was recorded by Connie Francis in 1962 and 1963 and a version can be found on her album Connie Francis Sings Award Winning Motion Picture Hits (1963).
1964 Caterina Valente - included on her album I Happen to Like New York.
1973 Bette Midler recorded a cover of the song for her album Bette Midler. The song is performed as a medley with "Optimistic Voices".  It also appears on her album Live At Last.
1977 The Pasadena Roof Orchestra included on their album The Show Must Go On.
1979 Bram Tchaikovsky as a single.
2003 Dianne Reeves recorded it on her album, A Little Moonlight.
2004 Chelsea Krombach covered this song on her debut album Profile.
2006 Tony Bennett and the Dixie Chicks as a track for his album Duets: An American Classic.
2016 Swing revivalists the Cherry Poppin' Daddies recorded a version for their album The Boop-A-Doo, a cover album of 1920s and 1930s jazz standards, taking its title from a lyric from the song.

Film appearances
1935  Gold Diggers of 1935,
1935  Special Agent
1935  G Men
1935 Page Miss Glory (Merrie Melodies cartoon), based on a Dubin-Warren song, the Dorsey Brothers Orchestra version served as part of the background music.
1951 Lullaby of Broadway, sung by Doris Day.
1993 Life With Mikey

In popular culture
It is also featured in an episode of Taxi (performed by Marilu Henner) and the Broadway musical 42nd Street, originated by Jerry Orbach playing Julian Marsh in the 1980 original cast.

In 1976, Wini Shaw's original recorded version of the song was released as a 45rpm single and made No. 42 in the UK Charts. Subsequently, the BBC interviewed Wini Shaw O'Malley in New York about her new success with it. She could not believe it.

The song was used in a commercial for the Milford Plaza Hotel, where it was called the "Lullabuy of Broadway".

The song was performed by a group of Muppet eskimos in the Gilda Radner episode of The Muppet Show.

In Lisa Stansfield's 1990 music video for her cover of Cole Porter's Down in the Depths, the beginning and ending are both references to the song. The video begins with her disembodied head zooming in, while singing the opening to the song, and ends with it zooming out, while singing the outro.

Linda Lavin and Martha Raye sang this song in the 1970s TV show Alice in the episode [Sharples vs Sharples]

In 2005, Idina Menzel recorded a pop/hip-hop version of the song for the end credits of ShowBusiness: The Road to Broadway.

The song appears on the dancing game Dance on Broadway.

References

1935 songs
Songs with music by Harry Warren
Songs with lyrics by Al Dubin
Bette Midler songs
Best Original Song Academy Award-winning songs
Doris Day songs
Tony Bennett songs
The Chicks songs
Bing Crosby songs
Connie Francis songs
Ella Fitzgerald songs
Caterina Valente songs
Songs about New York City